James Milton Kelly (May 5, 1946 – June 29, 2013) was an American athlete, martial artist, and actor. After winning several karate championships, Kelly rose to fame in the early 1970s appearing in various action films within the martial arts and blaxploitation genres. Kelly played opposite Bruce Lee in 1973's Enter the Dragon, and had lead roles in 1974's Black Belt Jones as the title character and Three the Hard Way as Mister Keyes. Kelly died of cancer on June 29, 2013, at age 67.

Early life and athletic career
Kelly's father ran a locker-rental service for Navy personnel. He began his athletic career at Bourbon County High School in Paris, Kentucky, competing in basketball, football, and track and field. He attended the University of Louisville on a football scholarship, but left during his freshman year after a coach referred to a black teammate with a racial slur. Instead he began to study Shorin-ryu karate.

Kelly began his martial arts career under the tutelage of Sin Kwang The' (Shaolin-Do) in Lexington, Kentucky. He trained in Okinawan karate under the direction of Parker Shelton, Nate Patton, and Gordon Doversola. During the early 1970s, Kelly became one of the most decorated world karate champions in the sport. In 1971, he won four prestigious championships that same year, most notably, the World Middleweight Karate title at the 1971 Long Beach International Karate Championships. Kelly opened his own dojo, which was frequented by numerous Hollywood celebrities and which ultimately landed him in the movies.

In addition to his martial arts and film careers, Kelly also became a professional tennis player. He played amateur tennis in the 1970s at Plummer Park in West Hollywood.   In 1975, he joined the USTA Senior Men's Circuit. He ultimately reached the No. 2 ranking in senior men's doubles in the state of California and the top ten in the state in senior men's singles.  Later in life, he became the owner and director of a tennis club in the San Diego area.

Acting career

Kelly was the first black martial arts film star. His first film role was a martial arts instructor in the thriller feature film Melinda (1972).  He got it after being asked by the film's writer, to whom he was introduced by one of his karate students, to teach martial arts to its star, Calvin Lockhart. Kelly then co-starred alongside Bruce Lee in the blockbuster, Enter the Dragon (1973). He played Williams, a martial artist invited to a tournament run by crime lord and renegade Shaolin monk Han.  The role was originally intended for actor Rockne Tarkington, who unexpectedly dropped out days before shooting in Hong Kong. Producer Fred Weintraub had heard about Kelly's karate studio in the Crenshaw district of Los Angeles, went there to see him, and was immediately impressed. That film gave him his most memorable lines:

This appearance also earned Kelly a three-film contract with Warner Brothers and led to starring roles in a string of martial arts-themed blaxploitation films. The first was Black Belt Jones (1974), in which he plays a local hero who fights the Mafia and a drug dealer threatening his friend's dojo. This and most of his other roles played up the novelty of an African-American martial arts master. His other two Warner Brothers films were Golden Needles (1974), with Joe Don Baker and Elizabeth Ashley, and Hot Potato (1976), in which he reprises his role as Black Belt Jones and rescues a diplomat's daughter from the jungles of Thailand. He also made three films with black action heroes Jim Brown and Fred Williamson:  Three the Hard Way (1974), in which he plays a martial artist who helps Brown and Williamson stop a black genocide plot, Take a Hard Ride (1975), a Spaghetti Western in which he plays a mute Indian scout skilled in martial arts, and One Down, Two to Go (1982), in which he plays a co-owner of an international martial arts dojo.   
In the late 1970s, he also starred in the low-budget films Black Samurai (1977), Death Dimension (1978), and Tattoo Connection (1978). After his appearance in One Down, Two to Go, Kelly rarely appeared in movies.  He did appear in two episodes of the TV series, Highway to Heaven, in 1985 and 1986. A deleted scene from the film Undercover Brother (2002), included on the DVD extra features, shows him in a cameo appearance with Eddie Griffin. In his last film, Kelly made a cameo appearance as Cleavon Washington in Afro Ninja (2009), produced, directed by, and starring veteran stuntman Mark Hicks.

In a 2010 interview with the Los Angeles Times, Kelly explained his absence from film:

Film and television director and producer Reginald Hudlin described Kelly's enduring identity:  “The iconography that Jim Kelly established as the cool martial artist with the giant ‘fro resonates to this day. If within only a few films you can create an image that lasts over 30 years, you must have done something really right. And he did.”

Personal life and death
Kelly was married twice:  from 1967 to 1968, to his college sweetheart Marilyn Dishman, and from 1980 until his death in 2013, to Marcia Bentley. From 1973 to 1976, Kelly dated film actress Rosalind Miles. On June 29, 2013, Kelly died of cancer at his home in San Diego, California. He was 67 years old.

Filmography

Film
Melinda (1972) – Charles Atkins
Enter the Dragon (1973) – Williams
Black Belt Jones (1974) – Black Belt Jones
Three the Hard Way (1974) – Mister Keyes
Golden Needles (1974) – Jeff
Take a Hard Ride (1975) – Kashtok
Hot Potato (1976) – Jones
Black Samurai (1977) – Robert Sand
The Tattoo Connection (a.k.a. E yu tou hei sha xing, Black Belt Jones 2) (1978) – Lucas
Death Dimension  (1978) – Lt. Detective J. Ash
The Amazing Mr. No Legs (a.k.a. Mr. No Legs) (1979)
One Down, Two to Go (1982) – Chuck
Stranglehold (1994) – Executive #4
Ultimatum (1994) – Executive
Macked, Hammered, Slaughtered and Shafted (2004) – Self
Afro Ninja (2009) – Cleavon Washington

Television
Highway to Heaven (1985–1986) – Reporter, station attendant (2 episodes)

See also

References

External links

1946 births
2013 deaths
American male film actors
20th-century American male actors
American male martial artists
American wushu practitioners
American Jeet Kune Do practitioners
American male taekwondo practitioners
American male karateka
Deaths from cancer in California
People from Millersburg, Kentucky
Male actors from Kentucky
African-American male actors
American male television actors
Shōrin-ryū practitioners